MTX may refer to:

 MTX (automobile)
 MtX (gender)
 Ford MTX transmission
 Ford MTX-75 transmission
 MTX Audio, a manufacturer of audio electronics
 Memotech MTX, a series of computers
 Maitotoxin, produced by the dinoflagellate Gambierdiscus toxicus
 Methotrexate, a drug used to treat cancer and autoimmune diseases
 Microtransaction, a monetization scheme in digital games
 The Mr. T Experience, a punk rock band